Hard Hit is a 2021 South Korean thriller film directed by Kim Chang-ju and starring Jo Woo-jin, Lee Jae-in and Ji Chang-wook. The film depicts the unpredictable circumstances the members of an ordinary family have to deal with after a mysterious phone call puts them in a horrific situation. It is a remake of Retribution, a 2015 Spanish action thriller film directed by Dani de la Torre.

The film was theatrically released on June 23, 2021. The film was a hit, crossing the 500,000 viewer mark on the 10th day of its release, which was the first for a Korean film in 2021.  it is fifth highest-grossing Korean film of 2021 and ranks number 17 among all the films released in the year 2021 in South Korea, with a gross of US$7.70 million and 955,809 admissions.

Synopsis
Seong-gyu (Jo Woo-jin), a manager of a branch of a bank in Busan, heads to work in his car with his daughter Hye-in (Lee Jae-in), who is about to take her entrance examination, and son. He gets a call, on a phone he discovers in the car's glove compartment, with a restricted caller ID (also known by the slang ‘black call’). The mysterious caller informs him that there is a bomb under his seat and if he tries to get out of the car it will explode. This triggers the beginning of a nightmare situation for the Seong-gyu family in the middle of downtown Busan.

Cast
 Jo Woo-jin as Lee Seong-gyu
 Lee Jae-in as Lee Hye-in, Seong-gyu's daughter
 Ji Chang-wook as Jin-woo, the phone caller
 Jin Kyung as the team leader of the explosives disposal team 
 Kim Ji-ho as Yeon-su, Seong-gyu's wife
 Ryu Seung-soo as the police chief
 Jeon Seok-ho as Jung-ho
 Lee Seol as Jung-ho's wife
 Jung In-gi
 Jung Ae-yun

Production

Casting
On January 13, 2020, Ji Chang-wook was confirmed to be starring in the film alongside Jo Woo-jin. Ji Chang-wook last appeared on the big screen in the 2017 film Fabricated City. It was also Kim Ji-ho's first appearance on screen after a four year break; she last appeared in the 2017 film Steel Rain.

The film is produced by TPS Company, with a production costs of 7 billion, and is distributed by CJ Entertainment. With this film, Kim Chang-joo made his debut as a director.

Filming
Filming began in early February 2020 in Haeundae city, a district of Busan, and wrapped in May 2020. Due to the impact of the COVID-19 pandemic, the city's roads were not crowded so the chase scenes were able to be filmed comfortably. Photos of the film being shot in Busan were released on June 23, 2021, the day of the film's release.

Release
The film was released theatrically in South Korea on June 23, 2021 on 1010 screens. 

It was released theatrically in Taiwan on July 22, 2021.

The film was screened at 10th Korean Film Festival Frankfurt on October 23, 2021.

Home media
The film was made available for streaming on IPTV, TVING, Naver TV, GOM Player, Google Play, One Store, and KakaoPage from July 20, 2021.

Reception

Box office
According to the integrated computer network for movie theater admissions by the Korea Film Council (KoFiC), the film attained first place at the Korean box office. As of June 23, 2021, it had amassed 57000 admissions, which was the best opening record among Korean films released in 2021. The film maintained its first place during the first week by mobilising 39,277, 47,505, 105,496 100,912, 35,743 and 35,114 admissions on the second, third, fourth, fifth, sixth and seventh days, respectively. The admission total at the end of the seventh day was 421,581.

According to the Korean Film Council, as of November 15, 2021, it stands at fifth place among all the Korean films released in the year 2021, with a gross of US$7.78 million and 955,809 admissions.

Critical response
Lee Da-won, writing for Sports Trend, opined that the power of the story lay in the conveyance of the message of 'human morality' and 'family love' alongside the thrills. Da-won praised Jo Woo-jin for expressing tension, remorse, and apologetic feelings with facial expressions as for 80% of the film he acts from the confined space of a driver's seat. She felt that Ji Chang-wook is a new find in completely different role in this film, and recommended that audiences head back to the theatre to see the film.

Yang So-young, writing for Star Today, praised the performance of actors Lee Jae-in and Jo Woo-jin. Writing about Jo Woo-jin, So-young said, "Jo Woo-jin persuasively portrays the fear, tension, urgency, and fatherly love that Seong-gyu feels in a confined and enclosed space." In conclusion, So-young wrote, "Literally no smoke holes, the second half may be disappointing depending on the audience, but you can enjoy 94 minutes."

Kim Young-sik, reviewing for Within News, praised the performance of Jo Woo-jin and wrote, "A work that definitely stands out for actor Jo Woo-jin's passionate performance." Young-sik also praised the car chase scenes, and noted that these are a standout for a solo lead.

Choo Seung-hyun of Seoul Economy praised the performances of Jo Woo-jin and Lee Jae-in. Highlighting the strengths of director Kim, who has previously worked as a film editor, Seung-hyun wrote, "The audience follows the same timeline as the main character, giving the impression of being right next to each other..." Seung-hyun liked the runtime of the film and wrote, "The running time of 94 minutes, which is neither too long nor too short, was expressed plainly without any fuss."

Jeon Hyeong-hwa, reviewing for Star News, wrote that the film is a familiar scenario so, to make it seem more fresh, the film was kept pacey. He praised the performances of Jo Woo-jin and Lee Jae-in. He noted that the charm of Busan is fully captured on a large screen, and concluded, "A movie proves that it tastes good only when it is seen in a theatre."

Awards and nominations

References

External links
 
 
 
 
 

CJ Entertainment films
2020s Korean-language films
Films postponed due to the COVID-19 pandemic
2021 films
Films about automobiles
Films about mobile phones
Films shot in Busan 
Films set in Busan
South Korean films about revenge
South Korean thriller films
South Korean remakes of Spanish films
Thriller film remakes
2021 directorial debut films